The Broncho Buster is a 1927 American silent Western film directed by Ernst Laemmle and starring Fred Humes,  Gloria Grey and Buck Connors.

Cast
 Fred Humes as Charlie Smith
 Gloria Grey as Barbara Furth
 Buck Connors as Sourdough Jones 
 Charles Lee Quinn as Jim Gray
 David Dunbar as Curtis Harris
 William Malan as Maj. John Furth

References

Bibliography
 Connelly, Robert B. The Silents: Silent Feature Films, 1910-36, Volume 40, Issue 2. December Press, 1998.
 Munden, Kenneth White. The American Film Institute Catalog of Motion Pictures Produced in the United States, Part 1. University of California Press, 1997.

External links
 

1927 films
1927 Western (genre) films
1920s English-language films
American silent feature films
Silent American Western (genre) films
Films directed by Ernst Laemmle
American black-and-white films
Universal Pictures films
1920s American films